Eagle 5 or Eagle V may refer to:

 Airtrike Eagle 5, an ultralight aircraft
 Eagle Mk 5, an open-wheeled open-cockpit CART/Indycar racecar manufactured by All American Racers
 Eagle V, a personal computer manufactured by Eagle Computer
 Eagle 5, the Winnebago spaceship driven by Cap. Lone Starr in the comedy sci-fi franchise Spaceballs
 A variation of the Mowag Eagle, a wheeled armored vehicle

See also
 Eagle (disambiguation)
 Five (disambiguation)